Ward Islands is a group of two small islands and off-lying rocks forming the southern part of the Amiot Islands, off the southwest part of Adelaide Island. Named by the United Kingdom Antarctic Place-Names Committee (UK-APC) for Herbert G.V. Ward, Chief Engineer of RRS John Biscoe, 1948–1962, which ship assisted the Royal Navy Hydrographic Survey Unit which charted this group in 1963.

See also 
 List of Antarctic and sub-Antarctic islands

Islands of Adelaide Island